Cheves Walling (1916 - June 18, 2007) was an American organic chemist, having been a Distinguished Professor Emeritus at  and also the former Editor-in-Chief of Journal of the American Chemical Society. He was also a Fellow of the National Academy of Sciences and American Academy of Arts & Sciences.

References

1916 births
2007 deaths
Organic chemists
University of Utah faculty
20th-century American chemists
Members of the United States National Academy of Sciences
Fellows of the American Academy of Arts and Sciences